The Thiel Fellowship (originally named 20 under 20) is a fellowship created by billionaire Peter Thiel through the Thiel Foundation. The fellowship is intended for students aged 22 or younger and offers them a total of $100,000 over two years, as well as guidance and other resources, to drop out of school and pursue other work, which could involve scientific research, creating a startup, or working on a social movement. Selection for the fellowship is through a competitive annual process, with about 20–25 fellows selected annually.

History 

Peter Thiel announced the fellowship at TechCrunch Disrupt in September 2010. The first round of fellows, based on applications made at the end of 2010, was announced in May 2011. The second round of fellows, based on applications made at the end of 2011, was announced in June 2012. That year, the fellowship launched a website called "20 Under 20 Documentary Series" that features an online documentary series of four Thiel Fellowship recipients.

The third class (announced in May 2013) included 22 fellows working on projects from garment manufacturing and B2B web products to ARM powered servers and biomedicine. The class included 7 fellows from outside of the US.

In December 2013, a Wall Street Journal article summarized the Thiel Fellowship up until that point: "64 Thiel Fellows have started 67 for-profit ventures, raised $55.4 million in angel and venture funding, published two books, created 30 apps and 135 full-time jobs, and brought clean water and solar power to 6,000 Kenyans who needed it."

The 2014 Thiel Fellows were announced in June 2014.

Reception

Initial reception

Thiel's announcement of the Thiel Fellowship met with a diverse array of responses. Some, such as Jacob Weisberg, criticized Thiel's proposal for its utopianism and attack on the importance of education. Others, such as Vivek Wadhwa, expressed skepticism about whether the success or failure of the Thiel Fellowship would carry any broader lessons regarding the value of higher education or the wisdom of dropping out.

In May 2011, shortly after the announcement of the first batch of Thiel Fellows, the admissions office at the Massachusetts Institute of Technology (MIT) congratulated two MIT students for receiving the Thiel Fellowship. Both students would need to drop out of MIT to receive the fellowship, but would be able to return to MIT to resume their studies after completing the two-year term of the fellowship if they so desired.

Later reception

A year after the announcement of the first batch of Thiel Fellows, opinions on the program ranged from the skeptical and critical to the laudatory and optimistic.

In 2012, Eric Markowitz offered a mixed review of the Thiel Fellowship in Inc. magazine.

In 2013 the program attracted criticism for its limited results. In April, an article by Richard Nieva for PandoDaily took a close look at how the first batch of Thiel Fellows had fared, finding that some had succeeded and others planned to return to school in the fall once their two years were up. In September, academic Vivek Wadhwa wrote that the Thiel Fellowship had failed to produce any notable successes to date, and even its limited successes were instances where the Thiel Fellows were working in collaboration with more experienced individuals. Also in October, former Harvard University President Larry Summers said at The Nantucket Project conference: "I think the single most misdirected bit of philanthropy in this decade is Peter Thiel's special program to bribe people to drop out of college." A Thiel Fellow and a mentor for the Thiel Fellowship subsequently published an op-ed response in TechCrunch, restating the Thiel Fellowship's thesis and arguing that a four-year liberal arts education was becoming less relevant.

Recipients

Notable recipients

Notable recipients include the following people (year they were awarded the fellowship is indicated in parentheses): 
 Laura Deming (2011) – founder and partner at Longevity Fund
Dale J. Stephens (2011) – founder of Year On, formerly UnCollege, a gap year program with training in work skills and life skills
Dylan Field (2012) – co-founder and CEO of Figma
Taylor Wilson (2012) – the second youngest person to produce nuclear fusion
Ritesh Agarwal (2013) – founder & CEO of OYO Rooms
Austin Russell (2013) – founder and CEO of Luminar Technologies and the world's youngest self-made billionaire as of 2021
Vitalik Buterin (2014) – co-creator of Ethereum
Stacey Ferreira (2015) – co-founder of Forge, a platform for gig workers
Simon Tian (2015) – creator of the Neptune Pine, a crowd-funded smartwatch
Cathy Tie (2015) – founder of Ranomics and Partner at Cervin Ventures
 Boyan Slat (2016) – founder and CEO of The Ocean Cleanup
Iddris Sandu (2018) –  co-founder of Spatial Labs
 Joshua Browder (2018) – founder & CEO of DoNotPay, an automated legal firm
 Erin Smith (2019) – creator of software to detect Parkinson's Disease

References

External links
 

Fellowships